Montijo is a town and municipality in the province of Badajoz, in Extremadura, Spain. It has a population of 16,236 inhabitants (in 2010). It is located between Badajoz and Mérida, near Guadiana river banks. The extension of the municipality covers 3 different centers of population: Lácara, Barbaño and Montijo, the last one being the capital.

The Battle of Montijo was fought near the town in 1644.

The town is also related to Eugenie de Montijo.

References

Municipalities in the Province of Badajoz